Jamie Nash is a fictional character from the British Channel 4 soap opera Hollyoaks, played by Stefan Booth. The character appeared between 2001 and 2002.

Storylines
Jamie arrived as one of the new students at Hollyoaks Community College. He was a jack-the-lad with a cheeky charm who was determined that his time at college was going to be one long party with many pretty girls on his arm.

His good looks worked well and he had many conquests in the village, so when a sexually transmitted disease went around at college, Jamie got the blame due to a witch hunt by his jilted conquest Eve Crawford. Although the claims turned out to be false, Jamie realised the error of his ways and with the help of sister Jodie, vowed to change his ways. This included running for student president against Chloe Bruce, which he won but did the decent thing and gave it up to Chloe, who was more serious about the job.

His new attitude extended to relationships as well. He admitted that despite all of his conquests, the only one he genuinely cared for was sexy Becca Hayton. Jamie vowed to win Becca back no matter what. She eventually gave in and got back together with him. For the first time ever Jamie fell in love, but Becca was torn between him and Alex Bell, who had also treated her badly in the past. Jamie was heartbroken when Becca dumped him, but was determined not to give up on the hope of a reconciliation with the only woman he ever loved.

Jamie won Becca back over time, but tragedy struck on a potholing trip with his mates, and Jamie died in hospital from his injuries moments after saying how happy he was with Becca. Becca was heartbroken that her boyfriend had died and discovered she was pregnant. Despite Jodie putting pressure on her to keep Jamie's baby, Becca made the hardest decision of her life and had an abortion.

References

Hollyoaks characters
Television characters introduced in 2001
Male characters in television